American singer and songwriter Bruno Mars has written songs for his extended play, three solo studio albums and one collaborative album, as well as for other artists and soundtracks. Mars came to prominence as a songwriter with Philip Lawrence and Ari Levine, who called themselves the Smeezingtons. The trio worked with various artists, notably on CeeLo Green's "Fuck You", B.o.B's "Nothin' on You" and Travie McCoy's "Billionaire" on which Mars sang the last two choruses. They also co-wrote songs for soundtracks: Mars's "It Will Rain" for The Twilight Saga: Breaking Dawn – Part 1 and "Young, Wild & Free" by Snoop Dogg and Wiz Khalifa featuring Mars for Mac & Devin Go to High School. Mars also co-wrote K'naan's "Wavin' Flag", used by Coca-Cola as the theme for the 2010 FIFA World Cup, and Matisyahu's "One Day", used as NBC's 2010 Winter Olympics theme.

The Smeezingtons wrote most of the songs on Mars's debut studio album, including the lead single, "Just the Way You Are", along with Khari Cain and Khalil Walton. The singer conceptualized the song, "there's no mind-boggling lyrics or twists in the story – they just come directly from the heart". On his second studio album, the Smeezingtons partnered with producer Jeff Bhasker, who also had a minor role in his debut record, as well as Mark Ronson, Emile Haynie and several other collaborators. Mars described making this album as "having the freedom and luxury of walking into the studio" and create "a hip-hop, R&B, soul or rock" song. Shampoo Press & Curl, a trio formed by Mars, Lawrence and Christopher Brody Brown, co-wrote all the tracks on his third studio album with other composers. Mars has said that the album was inspired by a non-existent movie that he visualized and the first single, "24K Magic", was its opening. Mars co-wrote with Anderson .Paak, as Silk Sonic, their first collaborative album titled An Evening with Silk Sonic. They enlisted record producer and songwriter D'Mile to help Mars produce the album.

After co-writing several songs together with the Smeezingtons, Mars worked with different producers to write several other songs, including Ronson's "Uptown Funk" and "Feel Right", both of which appeared on Ronson's Uptown Special (2015). He also co-wrote Cardi B's "Please Me" and "Wake Up in the Sky" by Gucci Mane and Kodak Black. Mars was one of the writers of Alicia Keys's "Tears Always Win", Adele's "All I Ask", Jay-Z & Kanye West's "Lift Off" and "Welcome Back" for the soundtrack of Rio 2. Mars has many writing credits to his name, including several unreleased tracks. Music Week noted Mars's talent and proficiency in songwriting and awarded the Smeezingtons the honor of Biggest Songwriters of 2010. Billboard named Mars the sixth-best songwriter of 2013. Several award shows nominated tracks he co-wrote. "Fuck You", "Grenade", "Locked Out of Heaven", "That's What I Like" and "Leave the Door Open" were nominated at the Grammy Awards for Song of the Year; the latter two songs won in that category.

Songs

Notes

References

 
Mars, Bruno, List of songs written by